Kamlesh Patel may refer to:
Kamlesh D. Patel
Kamlesh Patel, Baron Patel of Bradford
Kamlesh Patel (politician)